Eugen-Helmlé-Übersetzerpreis is a literary and translation prize of Germany. It was established in 2004 and first awarded in 2005. It is awarded annually and alternates between a French and German winner. The prize winner is awarded with €10,000.

Award winners

 2005: 
 2006: Claude Riehl (posthumous)
 2007: 
 2008: Nicole Bary
 2009: Lis Künzli
 2010: Olivier le Lay
 2011: Sabine Müller and Holger Fock
 2012: Alain Lance and Renate Lance-Otterbein
 2013: 
 2014: Cécile Wajsbrot
 2015: 
 2016: Anne Weber
 2017: 
 2018: 
 2019: 
 2020: Corinna Gepner
 2021: Andreas Jandl

References

Saarländischer Rundfunk
German literary awards
Translation awards
Awards established in 2005
2005 establishments in Germany